Nicola Muscat (born 25 June 1994) is a Maltese swimmer. She competed in the women's 50m freestyle at the 2012 and 2016 Summer Olympics in London, finishing with a time of 27.22 and 26.60 seconds in the heats, respectively.

References

External links

1994 births
Living people
People from Żebbuġ
Maltese female swimmers
Olympic swimmers of Malta
Swimmers at the 2012 Summer Olympics
Swimmers at the 2016 Summer Olympics
Maltese female freestyle swimmers